The first season of the fantasy drama television series Game of Thrones premiered on HBO on April 17, 2011, in the U.S. and concluded on June 19, 2011. It consists of ten episodes, each of approximately 55 minutes. The series is based on A Game of Thrones, the first novel in the A Song of Ice and Fire series by George R. R. Martin, adapted for television by David Benioff and D. B. Weiss. 

HBO had ordered a television pilot in November 2008; filming began the following year. However, it was deemed unsatisfactory and later reshot with some roles recast. In March 2010, HBO ordered the first season, which began filming in July 2010, primarily in Belfast, Northern Ireland, with additional filming in Malta.

The story takes place in a fantasy world, primarily upon the continent Westeros, with one storyline occurring on another continent to the east, Essos. Like the novel, the season initially focuses on the family of nobleman Eddard "Ned" Stark, the Warden of the North, who is asked to become the King's Hand (chief advisor) to his longtime friend, King Robert Baratheon. Ned seeks to find out who murdered his predecessor, Jon Arryn. He uncovers dark secrets about the powerful Lannister family, which includes Robert's queen, Cersei, that his predecessor died trying to expose. This leads, after Robert's death, to Ned's arrest for treason. Ned's eldest son, Robb, begins a rebellion against the Lannisters. Ned is killed at the order of Cersei's tyrannical teenage son, King Joffrey Baratheon. Meanwhile, in Essos, the exiled Viserys Targaryen, son of the former king, forces his sister Daenerys to marry a Dothraki warlord in exchange for an army to pursue his claim to the Iron Throne. The season ends with Viserys dead and Daenerys becoming the Mother of Dragons.

Game of Thrones features a large ensemble cast, including established actors such as Sean Bean, Mark Addy, Nikolaj Coster-Waldau, Michelle Fairley, Lena Headey, Iain Glen, and Peter Dinklage. Newer actors were cast as the younger generation of characters, such as Emilia Clarke, Kit Harington, Sophie Turner, and Maisie Williams.

Critics praised the show's production values and cast; Dinklage's portrayal of Tyrion Lannister received specific accolades, as did Bean and Clarke, as well as Ramin Djawadi for music.

The first season won two of the thirteen Emmy Awards for which it was nominated: Outstanding Supporting Actor in a Drama Series (Dinklage) and Outstanding Main Title Design.  It was also nominated for Outstanding Drama Series. U.S. viewership rose by approximately 33% over the course of the season, from 2.2 million to over 3 million by the finale.

Episodes

Cast

Main cast

Starring 

 Sean Bean as Eddard "Ned" Stark
 Mark Addy as Robert Baratheon
 Nikolaj Coster-Waldau as Jaime Lannister
 Michelle Fairley as Catelyn Stark
 Lena Headey as Cersei Lannister
 Emilia Clarke as Daenerys Targaryen
 Iain Glen as Jorah Mormont
 Harry Lloyd as Viserys Targaryen
 Kit Harington as Jon Snow

 Sophie Turner as Sansa Stark
 Maisie Williams as Arya Stark
 Richard Madden as Robb Stark
 Alfie Allen as Theon Greyjoy
 Isaac Hempstead Wright as Bran Stark
 Jack Gleeson as Joffrey Baratheon
 Rory McCann as Sandor "The Hound" Clegane
 Peter Dinklage as Tyrion Lannister
 Aidan Gillen as Petyr "Littlefinger" Baelish

Also starring
 Jason Momoa as Khal Drogo

Guest cast
The recurring actors listed here are those who appeared in season 1. They are listed by the region in which they first appear:

At and beyond the Wall
 James Cosmo as Jeor Mormont
 Peter Vaughan as Maester Aemon
 Brian Fortune as Othell Yarwyck
 Joseph Mawle as Benjen Stark
 Owen Teale as Alliser Thorne
 Francis Magee as Yoren
 John Bradley as Samwell Tarly
 Josef Altin as Pyp
 Mark Stanley as Grenn
 Luke McEwan as Rast
 Rob Ostlere as Waymar Royce
 Bronson Webb as Will
 Dermot Keaney as Gared

In King's Landing
 Callum Wharry as Tommen Baratheon
 Aimee Richardson as Myrcella Baratheon
 Gethin Anthony as Renly Baratheon
 Julian Glover as Grand Maester Pycelle
 Conleth Hill as Varys
 Ian McElhinney as Barristan Selmy
 Ian Beattie as Meryn Trant
 David Michael Scott as Beric Dondarrion
 Finn Jones as Loras Tyrell
 Eugene Simon as Lancel Lannister
 Wilko Johnson as Ilyn Payne
 Conan Stevens as Gregor Clegane
 Dominic Carter as Janos Slynt
 Jefferson Hall as Hugh of the Vale
 Miltos Yerolemou as Syrio Forel
 Andrew Wilde as Tobho Mott
 Joe Dempsie as Gendry
 Eros Vlahos as Lommy Greenhands
 Ben Hawkey as Hot Pie

In the North
 Art Parkinson as Rickon Stark
 Clive Mantle as Greatjon Umber
 Steven Blount as Rickard Karstark
 Donald Sumpter as Maester Luwin
 Ron Donachie as Rodrik Cassel
 Jamie Sives as Jory Cassel
 Susan Brown as Septa Mordane
 Margaret John as Old Nan
 Kristian Nairn as Hodor
 Esmé Bianco as Ros
 Natalia Tena as Osha

In the Riverlands
 Charles Dance as Tywin Lannister
 David Bradley as Walder Frey
 Ian Gelder as Kevan Lannister
 Jerome Flynn as Bronn
 Emun Elliott as Marillion
 Sibel Kekilli as Shae
 Rhodri Hosking as Mycah

In the Vale
 Lino Facioli as Robin Arryn
 Kate Dickie as Lysa Arryn
 Mark Lewis Jones as Shagga

In Essos
 Roger Allam as Illyrio Mopatis
 Dar Salim as Qotho
 Elyes Gabel as Rakharo
 Amrita Acharia as Irri
 Roxanne McKee as Doreah
 Mia Soteriou as Mirri Maz Duur

Production
HBO originally optioned the rights to A Song of Ice and Fire in 2007, at which time David Benioff and D. B. Weiss were identified as the project's writers and executive producers. The first and second drafts of the pilot script, written by Benioff and Weiss, were submitted in August 2007, and June 2008, respectively. While HBO found both drafts to their liking, a pilot was not ordered until November 2008, with the 2007–2008 Writers Guild of America strike possibly delaying the process.

Benioff and Weiss served as main writers and showrunners for the first season. They contributed eight out of ten episodes, including one co-written with Jane Espenson. The two remaining episodes were written by Bryan Cogman and A Song of Ice and Fire author George R. R. Martin.

Tom McCarthy directed the original pilot, but much of this was later re-shot by Tim Van Patten as the pilot was reworked into the first episode of the complete season. Van Patten also directed the second episode. McCarthy is still credited as a consulting producer for the series' first episode. Brian Kirk and Daniel Minahan directed three episodes each, and Alan Taylor directed the final two.

Before Game of Thrones both Benioff and Weiss worked in film, and were unfamiliar with working on a television show. This resulted in several first-season episodes being about 10 minutes too short for HBO, forcing them to write another 100 pages of scripts in two weeks. Due to lack of budget the new scenes were designed to be inexpensive to film, such as two actors conversing in one room. Benioff and Weiss noted that some of their favorite scenes from the first season were the results of the dilemma, including one between Robert and Cersei Baratheon discussing their marriage.

Casting
On May 5, 2009, it was announced that Peter Dinklage had been signed on to star as Tyrion Lannister in the pilot, and that Tom McCarthy was set to direct. On July 19, 2009, a number of further casting decisions were announced, including Sean Bean being given the role of Ned Stark. Other actors signed on for the pilot were Kit Harington in the role of Jon Snow, Jack Gleeson as Joffrey Baratheon, Harry Lloyd as Viserys Targaryen, and Mark Addy as Robert Baratheon.

At the beginning of August 2009, it was revealed that Catelyn Stark would be portrayed by Jennifer Ehle. On August 20, more casting announcements were made, including Nikolaj Coster-Waldau as Jaime Lannister and Tamzin Merchant as Daenerys Targaryen, as well as Richard Madden in the role of Robb Stark, Iain Glen as Ser Jorah Mormont, Alfie Allen as Theon Greyjoy, Sophie Turner as Sansa Stark and Maisie Williams as Arya Stark. On September 1 Lena Headey was announced as Cersei Lannister. On September 23, Martin confirmed that Rory McCann had been cast as Sandor Clegane. Isaac Hempstead-Wright was confirmed as Bran Stark on October 14, followed by an announcement of Jason Momoa as Khal Drogo three days later.

After the pilot was shot and the series picked up, it was announced that the role of Catelyn had been recast, with Michelle Fairley replacing Ehle.  Later, it was also confirmed that Emilia Clarke would replace Tamzin Merchant as Daenerys. The rest of the cast was filled out in the second half of the year, and included Charles Dance as Tywin Lannister, Aidan Gillen as Petyr 'Littlefinger' Baelish, and Conleth Hill as Varys.

Filming

The pilot episode was initially filmed on location in Northern Ireland, Scotland, and Morocco by Tom McCarthy between October 24 and November 19, 2009.  However, the pilot was deemed unsatisfactory and much of it had to be reshot together with the other episodes of the season in Northern Ireland and Malta.

Most scenes were shot in Northern Ireland and Republic of Ireland border counties.  Principal photography was scheduled to begin on July 26, 2010, with the primary studio location being the Paint Hall Studio in the Titanic Quarter of Belfast, Northern Ireland. Among various locations for the initial shooting of the pilot in 2009, Doune Castle in central Scotland was used as the location for Winterfell, including scenes at its great hall (the great hall was later recreated in a soundstage in Northern Ireland).  Additional filming locations included Cairncastle at Larne, Shane's Castle, and Tollymore Forest Park, all in Northern Ireland. In the 2010 shooting of the series, Castle Ward was used as Winterfell instead of Doune Castle, with Cairncastle for some exterior Winterfell scenes. The set for Castle Black was built at Magheramorne quarry. The show's presence in Northern Ireland and use of Paint Hall created hundreds of jobs for residents, and made the area "a hub for film and television production".

The "King's Landing" exterior scenes were shot at various locations in Malta, including the city of Mdina and the island of Gozo. The filming in Malta resulted in controversy when a protected ecosystem was damaged by a subcontractor.

Music

The soundtrack to Game of Thrones was originally to be composed by Stephen Warbeck. On February 2, 2011, only ten weeks prior to the show's premiere, it was reported that Warbeck had left the project and Ramin Djawadi had been commissioned to write the music instead.  The music supervisor of Game of Thrones Evyen Klean first suggested Djawadi to Benioff and Weiss as the replacement for Warbeck, and although Djawadi was reluctant as he had other commitments at that time, they managed to persuade Djawadi to accept the project.

To give the series its own distinctive musical identity, according to Djawadi, the producers asked him not to use musical elements such as flutes or solo vocals that had already been successfully used by other major fantasy productions. He mentioned that a challenge in scoring the series was its reliance on dialogue and its sprawling cast: on several occasions already-scored music had to be omitted so as not to get in the way of dialogue.

Djawadi said that he was inspired to write the main title music by an early version of the series's computer-animated title sequence. The title music is reprised as a global theme in the rest of the soundtrack, initially infrequently and as part of the theme of individual characters, then in full towards the end of season 1 during particularly important scenes.

Reception

Pre-release 
Anticipation for the series was described by various media outlets as very high, with a dedicated fan base closely following the show's development. By April 2011, multiple entertainment news outlets had put it at the top of their lists of television events to look forward to in 2011.

Critical response

On Rotten Tomatoes, the first season has a 91% approval rating from 43 critics with an average rating of 8.38 out of 10. The site's critical consensus reads, "Its intricate storytelling and dark themes may overwhelm some viewers, but Game of Thrones is a transportive, well-acted, smartly written drama even non-genre fans can appreciate." The first season of Game of Thrones has a Metacritic average of 80 out of 100 based on 28 critic reviews, categorized as "generally favorable". 

The majority of reviews for the first season were very positive, with critics noting the high production values, the well-realized world, compelling characters, and giving particular note to the strength of the child actors. 

Robert Bianco of USA Today gave the season a positive review and stated, "It's all very well told and well acted, but those who insist on comparing it to The Lord of the Rings are setting up expectations Game [Of Thrones] cannot possibly match." Tim Goodman of The Hollywood Reporter gave the season a positive review and stated, "Worth the wait? Absolutely. And even if you have no idea what all the fuss is about, you should get in from the start to absorb Martin's fantastical tale." Mary McNamara of the Los Angeles Times gave the season a positive review and stated that it was a "a great and thundering series of political and psychological intrigue bristling with vivid characters, cross-hatched with tantalizing plotlines and seasoned with a splash of fantasy." Ken Tucker of Entertainment Weekly gave it a score of 'A−' and stated, "Free your eyes to take in the spectacle, and your brain will magically start following the intricate storytelling. And there's a magical realism to Game of Thrones." 

James Poniewozik of Time gave the season a positive review and stated, "This epic, unflinching fantasy noir takes our preconceptions of chivalry, nobility and magic and gets medieval on them." Alan Sepinwall of HitFix gave the season a positive review too and stated, "Game of Thrones deposits me in a world I never expected to visit and doesn't leave me feeling stranded and adrift, but eager to immerse myself in the local culture." Brian Lowry of Variety gave the season a positive review and stated, "In terms of visual ambition and atmosphere, this series challenges the movie world on summer-tentpole turf, while simultaneously capitalizing on an episodic approach that allows the interlocking stories to unfold in a manner no feature ever could."

Phillip Maciak of Slant Magazine gave it 2.5 out of 4 stars and stated, "If Game of Thrones can find its place in the personal (in the power, corruption, and integrity to be found in individual souls), then it can transcend the ugly social and historical dynamics that it so casually relies on and reproduces." David Hinckley of New York Daily News stated, "Fans of the acclaimed Game of Thrones books, or even fans of fantasy realms in general, will find much to admire and enjoy here."

Troy Patterson of Slate gave the season a negative review and stated, "There is the sense of intricacy having been confused with intrigue and of a story transferred all too faithfully from its source and thus not transformed to meet the demands of the screen." Hank Stuever of The Washington Post gave the season a negative review and stated, "Even for the most open minds, Game of Thrones can be a big stein of groggy slog." Ginia Bellafante of The New York Times gave the season a negative review and stated, "Game of Thrones serves up a lot of confusion in the name of no larger or really relevant idea beyond sketchily fleshed-out notions that war is ugly, families are insidious and power is hot."

Ratings

The first episode attracted 2.2 million viewers its initial airing on April 17 in the U.S., and totaled 5.4 million viewers across multiple Sunday and Monday night airings. It averaged 743,000 and reached a peak 823,000 in UK and Ireland on its April 18 premiere. HBO announced that they would be commissioning a second season on the strength of the reception of the premiere episode. By the final episode of the season, which aired June 20, the ratings had climbed to over 3 million.

Accolades

The first season of Game of Thrones was nominated for thirteen Emmy Awards, including Outstanding Drama Series, Outstanding Directing for a Drama Series (Tim Van Patten for "Winter Is Coming"), and Outstanding Writing for a Drama Series (David Benioff and D. B. Weiss for "Baelor"). It won two, Outstanding Supporting Actor in a Drama Series (Peter Dinklage) and Outstanding Main Title Design. Dinklage, who plays Tyrion, was also named best supporting actor by the Golden Globes, the Scream Awards and the Satellite Awards.

Release

Broadcast
Game of Thrones premiered on HBO in the United States and Canada on April 17, 2011, and on Sky Atlantic in the United Kingdom and Ireland on April 18, 2011, with a same-day release on HBO Central Europe. The series premiered in Australia on Showcase on July 17, 2011.

Home media
The first season of Game of Thrones was released on DVD and Blu-ray Disc on March 6, 2012. The set includes extra background and behind-the-scenes material, but no deleted scenes, because almost all footage shot for the first season was used in the show.

HBO released a Collector's Edition DVD/Blu-ray combo pack of the first season, which includes a resin-carved Dragon Egg Paperweight. The set was released in the United States and Canada on November 20, 2012. The first season was  released on 4K UHD Blu-ray on June 5, 2018.

References

External links
  – official US site
  – official UK site
 Game of Thrones – The Viewers Guide on HBO.com
 Making Game of Thrones on HBO.com
 
 

Season 1
2011 American television seasons
Hugo Award for Best Dramatic Presentation, Long Form winning works